Melissa O'Neil is the self-titled debut album by Canadian Idol winner Melissa O'Neil. It was released in Canada on November 22, 2005  through Sony BMG Music Canada. The album was produced by Rob Wells, Adam Alexander & Chris Perry, Jeff Dalziel and executive produced by Jennifer Hyland.

Track listing

Singles
"Alive" (October 2005)
"Let It Go" (November 2005)
"Speechless" (April 2006)

External links
www.melissaoneil.com

Melissa O'Neil albums
2005 debut albums